Liberty Station is a mixed-use development in San Diego, California, on the site of the former Naval Training Center San Diego. It is located in the Point Loma community of San Diego. It has a waterfront location, on a boat channel off of San Diego Bay, just west of the San Diego Airport and a few miles north of Downtown San Diego.  The  project includes several distinct districts: a retail and commercial district, a promenade focused on nonprofit activities, an educational district, a residential district, a hotel district, an office district, and a park/open space area along the boat channel.

The Naval Training Center site is listed on the National Register of Historic Places, and many of the individual structures are designated as historic by the city of San Diego. Dozens of the historical buildings are being adapted for stores, offices, schools, and other purposes.

History

The project started when the Navy announced in 1993 that it was closing the San Diego training center. The City of San Diego created a 27-member commission to determine what to do with the site. The commission developed and the city accepted a detailed plan that served as the basis for a request for quotation from a master developer; The Corky McMillin Company was selected. The base closed with a ceremony on March 21, 1997.

In November 2012 Phase Two of the renovation was completed, bringing the total number of buildings successfully adapted to fifteen. The nonprofit NTC Foundation oversees the development of the historic and nonprofit area. According to Foundation director Alan Ziter, "This is the largest historical preservation project in San Diego and it's also the city's largest arts and culture project in terms of size and scope. It's been slow and steady. But we'll get it done."

In 2014 the NTC Command Center was named in honor of Richard “Dick” Laub, a Point Loma realtor and Navy veteran, after his widow donated $1.5 million USD to the NTC Foundation.

Retail and commercial district 

The retail and commercial district of Liberty Station is divided into five sections: The Marketplace, Ocean Village, NTC Landing, Harbor Square, and Fitness Club. The Marketplace section is located on Truxtun Road, between Womble and Roosevelt Road, adjacent to Rosecrans Street; it is the most developed of the commercial areas. The NTC Landing section of Liberty Station is located at Lytton Avenue and Truxton Road and is accessed through the iconic gate off Lytton Avenue, formerly NTC's Gate 6, whose image serves as a kind of visual symbol for all of Liberty Station. The Harbor Square section of Liberty Station is located at Laning Road and Harbor Drive, across from San Diego Bay and Naval Base Point Loma. The Fitness Club section is located on Roosevelt Road at Historic Decatur Road and is still being developed. The Ocean Village section, which has not yet been developed, is located on Historic Decatur Road and Perry Road; it is planned as a maritime-themed area with retail and light industrial tenants as well as public access to the boat channel.

Anchor tenants of the retail and commercial districts include Vons, Trader Joe's, and Ace Hardware. There are several dozen restaurants, including several Starbucks coffee shops, and a variety of retail shops. In May 2013, Stone Brewing World Bistro and Gardens opened on Historic Decatur Road. The  facility cost $8 million and can seat 700 patrons; it is the largest retail enterprise at Liberty Station. In May 2016 Boffo Cinemas opened a six-screen multiplex theater called The Lot; it is located in the renovated historic Luce Auditorium.

Several of the retail establishments, including Vons and Stone Brewing, are built inside historic structures from Naval Training Center days. In order to maintain the external appearance of the historic structures they have unusual layouts. The Vons store occupies two separate buildings, formerly barracks, separated by an open courtyard. Stone Brewing incorporates multiple buildings including the former mess hall.

The NTC Landing section is home to the historic Sail Ho Golf Course, which was built in the 1920s by Albert Spalding of Spalding Sports. Being the oldest golf course in San Diego, it was originally the San Diego Country Club called the Loma Club. It also used to be utilized by the Navy as a fitness training area for recruits. Under the NTC Foundation, Sail Ho has recently been renovated by Cary Bickler who redesigned the fairways, greens, and practice facilities. The practice facilities provide lessons from the PGA Professional, Tim Purin. Other famous golfers who have invested their time at Sail Ho include Craig Stadler and Phil Mickelson, both of whom played junior golf tournaments here when they were young. The nine-hole executive course also features a pro-shop and the Sail Ho Bar & Grill.

Promenade 

The NTC Promenade is a group of historic buildings being renovated for the display of arts, science, culture, and technology. It houses theater groups, dance companies, museums, galleries, and classes of many kinds. There are also several venues for public and private events, including the former chapel and former mess hall of the Naval Training Center. The base's former command center and the former parade ground are also included in the Promenade. The command center building contains displays about the history of NTC and of Point Loma, and has an adjacent rose garden which was planted by the wife of an early base commander. This  area is operated by the non-profit NTC Foundation.

The term "promenade" is also used to describe a landscaped linear open-space area that runs the length of the development.

Educational district 
The educational district of Liberty Station consists of High Tech Village, a group of public charter schools collectively known as High Tech High. The campus includes five high schools, two middle schools, and two elementary schools. The schools are part of the San Diego City Schools. The high school students are allowed to walk to the retail and commercial district during lunch.

Residential district 
The residential district of Liberty Station has two main sections, one section for military housing and the other a residential community developed by the McMillin Corporation. The military housing area is not properly part of the Liberty Station development and is still owned by the U.S. Government. It includes 500 units, mostly townhomes, and also features children's playgrounds and sports facilities. The exterior of the housing is in a Spanish architectural style in keeping with traditional San Diego.

The civilian residential community includes townhomes, row homes, and single family homes. In 2007 it was named by Money magazine as one of the best places to retire in San Diego. However, people of all ages live in the community, young families as well as retired couples.

Hotel district 

The hotel district of Liberty Station is designated for several hotels, currently including a Homewood Suites by Hilton and a Courtyard by Marriott. A large resort hotel by Nickelodeon is on the drawing boards. The hotel district also contains the historic training structure . Formerly a commissioned "non-ship" of the U.S. Navy, this is a two-thirds scale model of a Navy frigate built right into the ground. She was used to teach shipboard procedures to recruits and was affectionately nicknamed the USS Neversail. She is currently unoccupied but is slated to become a museum at some time in the future. She is visible from North Harbor Drive.

Office district 
The office district is a collection of newly built office buildings whose architecture reflects the Spanish Colonial Revival style of the original NTC buildings.

Rock Church 
Rock Church, a non-denominational, evangelical Christian megachurch, was constructed in 2005 and opened in 2007. It occupies the site of the former Technical Training Center at Service School Command San Diego (Building 94, constructed 1969). The building houses new Christian education facilities, office space, and a 3,500 seat worship center, making it one of the largest auditoriums in Southern California. The church currently averages 12,000 in attendance per week, making it the largest church in San Diego.  Adjacent to the church is the Rock Academy, a private Christian school serving students from pre-kindergarten through twelfth grade.

In May 2012 the San Diego County Grand Jury issued a report concluding that the church's location in an area designated for education use is inappropriate, and recommending that the city  "Suspend the current Conditional Use Permit for the Rock Academy and Church pending a review for compliance and compatibility with the NTC Precise Plan and Local Coastal Program report (September 2001) and determine the Church’s appropriateness for that area." However, in August the mayor said he would not suspend the church's permit, describing the proposed suspension as "unreasonable".

52 Boats Memorial

In 1995 the San Diego Chapter of United States Submarine Veterans of World War II voted unanimously to create a memorial to the 52 U.S. Navy submarines and 3,505 submariners lost in World War II.  After 14 years of fundraising, planning and dealing with bureaucracy, the memorial was dedicated at Liberty Station.

The memorial honors the 52 submarines that were lost in World War II.  It consists of 52 American Liberty Elm trees, 52 flags and 52 granite memorials to the ships and men who were lost.  The project was driven by Doug Smay, whose father served in submarines during World War II.  The memorial consists of two long sidewalks, flanked by the trees, flags and plaques.  Ninety percent of the money for the project was raised through private donations.

Park and open space 
The park and open space area includes the golf course as well as a  waterfront park with playground areas, a walking/jogging trail along the boat channel, and an athletic club. Due to its large open areas, Liberty Station is a popular setting for 5k walk/runs sponsored by local businesses and non-profit organizations. Seasonal kayak and paddle board rentals are offered as well.

Liberty Station has several fitness and therapy centers as well as gyms and athletic clubs, including Point Loma Sports Club, Therapy Specialists, Yoga Six, Fitness Without Walls, Fitness Together, San Diego Gymnastics, Riptide Soccer Club, Pilates By The Bay, Performing Arts & Athletics Restorative Training Specialists, and Walkabout International.

An aquatic center is planned on 3.7 acres in the active space area of NTC Park. The City of San Diego is in the process of approving a contract with an architect to begin the community input and design phase of the project.

References

External links

 Liberty Station Homepage
 Interactive Map of Liberty Station

Point Loma, San Diego
Buildings and structures in San Diego
Formerly Used Defense Sites in California
History of San Diego
Maritime history of California
Tourist attractions in San Diego
Spanish Colonial Revival architecture in California